Vaazhga Jananayagam is a 1996 Tamil-language political satire film directed by E. Ramdoss. The film stars Mansoor Ali Khan and Pragathi, with John Amirtharaj, S. S. Chandran, T. S. Raghavendra, Pandu, Raveendra Babu and Mahanadi Shankar playing supporting roles. It was released on 7 March 1996, and failed at the box office.

Plot

Bhagat Singh (Mansoor Ali Khan) is an angry young man who cannot tolerate injustice. He buys and sells old stuff: he owns a small junk shop. Next to his shop, there is a fruit shop owned by the bubbly girl Anjala (Pragathi) and she likes to tease the short-tempered Bhagat Singh. Meanwhile, the corrupt police officer Sivashankar (Mahanadi Shankar) is transferred to a new city, where he forces the tradespeople to give him bribes. One day, he clashes with the talkative Anjala. Bhagat Singh stops their fight and humiliates the corrupt police officer. Later, Sivashankar tries to rape Anjala but Bhagat Singh comes in time and saves her. Worried about Anjala, Bhagat Singh immediately marries her.

One day, Bhagat Singh witnesses the murder of a journalist in front of his shop. The goons then beat up Bhagat Singh for no reason, he then hits back and Bhagat Singh wounds severely the local don Zinda (Raveendra Babu). This news reaches the Minister Sisubalan (John Amirtharaj) who considered the don Zinda as his right hand. Sisubalan asks Bhagat Singh to join him but he refuses. Later that night, Bhagat Singh is arrested and beaten by the police.

In a police lockup, Bhagat Singh remembers his tragic past. In the past, Bhagat Singh was a graduate and lived with his mother but he could not find a job. Bhagat Singh and his mother sold their house to bribe Sisubalan's accountant Ramanujam (T. S. Raghavendra). Sisubalan and Ramanujam ripped him off and Bhagat Singh's mother died due to the shock. Heartbroken, Bhagat Singh decided to become a junk dealer.

The rest of the story is how Bhagat Singh takes revenge on his enemies.

Cast

Mansoor Ali Khan as Bhagat Singh
Pragathi as Anjala
John Amirtharaj as Sisubalan
S. S. Chandran
T. S. Raghavendra as Ramanujam
Pandu as Anjala's father
Raveendra Babu as Zinda
Mahanadi Shankar as Sivashankar
Kumarimuthu
Oru Viral Krishna Rao
Joker Thulasi
Krishnamoorthy as Kicha
Nellai Siva
Bonda Mani
Kallukkul Eeram Ramanathan
Singamuthu
Arulmani as Chitragupta
Chandrasekhar 
Delhi Ganesh in a guest appearance
Vimalraj
Shanmugasundari as Muniyamma
Kokila as Maha
Sharmili
Kavithasri
Revathi
Sahadevan
Mahadevan
K. R. Vijaya
V. Gowthaman in an uncredited role

Soundtrack

The film score and the soundtrack were composed by actor Mansoor Ali Khan. The soundtrack, released in 1996, features 8 tracks with lyrics written by Mansoor Ali Khan.

References

1996 films
1990s Tamil-language films
Indian political satire films
Films directed by E. Ramdoss
1990s political satire films